Marbled eel is a common name for several fishes; while it most commonly refers to Anguilla marmorata, it may also refer to:

 Anarchias seychellensis, Seychelles moray, or marbled reef-eel
 Anguilla marmorata, marbled eel or giant mottled eel
 Anguilla reinhardtii, marbled eel or speckled longfin eel
 Callechelys marmorata, marbled snake eel
 Gymnothorax obesus, speckled moray or marbled reef eel
 Lepophidium marmoratum, marbled brotula or marbled cusk-eel
 Muraenolepis marmorata, marbled moray cod or marbled eel-cod
 Mastacembelus vanderwaali, ocellated spiny eel or marbled spiny-eel
 Mastacembelus armatus, large spiny eel or marbled spiny eel
 Synbranchus marmoratus, marbled swamp eel or mottled swamp eel
 Torpedo sinuspersici, marbled electric eel or gulf torpedo, an electric ray
 Uropterygius marmoratus, marbled reef-eel, marbled eel or slender conger eel